Tim Henman was the defending champion but did not compete that year.

Nikolay Davydenko won in the final 6–2, 7–6(7–3) against Kristof Vliegen.

Seeds

  Wayne Ferreira (first round)
  Max Mirnyi (second round)
  Thomas Enqvist (first round)
  Ivan Ljubičić (second round)
  Mariano Zabaleta (quarterfinals)
  Alberto Martín (quarterfinals)
  Olivier Rochus (first round)
  Vince Spadea (second round)

Draw

Finals

Top half

Bottom half

External links
 2003 AAPT Championships Draw

Next Generation Adelaide International
2003 ATP Tour
2003 in Australian tennis